Fredell Lamont Anderson (born October 30, 1954) is an American former National Football League (NFL) defensive lineman who played for the Pittsburgh Steelers (1978–1979) and the Seattle Seahawks (1980–1982).

Early life 
Anderson was born in Toppenish, Washington in 1954 and attended Toppenish High School.

Career 
He played college football for Oregon State University and Prairie View A&M University. He was then drafted by the Pittsburgh Steelers. He stayed there for the 1980 season before being released, and won Super Bowl XIII against the Dallas Cowboys and Super Bowl XIV against the Los Angeles Rams. He was later picked up by the Seattle Seahawks in 1980, where he stayed for three seasons.

External links
Database Football: Fred Anderson stats

References 

1954 births
Living people
People from Toppenish, Washington
American football defensive linemen
Oregon State Beavers football players
Prairie View A&M University alumni
Pittsburgh Steelers players
Seattle Seahawks players
Birmingham Stallions players